Vladimir Ivanovich Savchenko was a Soviet Ukrainian science fiction writer and engineer.

Born on February 15, 1933, in Poltava, he studied at the Moscow Power Engineering Institute and was an electronics engineer. Savchenko, who wrote in Russian , published his first short stories in the late 1950s, and his first novel (Black Stars) in 1960. His works were often self-published. Savchenko also authored several texts about physics and engineering, including the article "Sixteen New Formulas of Physics and Cosmology," which he considered to be his most important scientific text.

As of today, Savchenko's works have been published in 29 countries and have been translated into many of the world's languages.

He was found dead on January 19, 2005, in Kyiv. He was 71 years old.

Biography
Savchenko was a graduate of the Moscow Power Engineering Institute. He worked at the V.M. Glushkov Institute of Cybernetics in Kyiv.

His first publication, "Toward the Stars" (1955), identified the author as an advocate of science fiction that was interested in exploring the heuristic potential of the personality. In 1956, Savchenko's story "The Awakening of Professor Bern" was published. Of publications in his native Ukrainian language, the most well-known is the story "The Ghost of Time" (1964).

In the novel Black Stars, Savchenko investigated the boundaries of traditional science, putting forward original hypotheses. In particular, Savchenko's 1959 novel The Second Expedition to the Strange Planet (known in English as The Second Oddball Expedition) explored the political nuances revealed by contact with crystalline forms of life. Savchenko positioned himself as an adherent of the cybernetic view of society and the living organism, consistently developing different aspects of the process of self-discovery. After the 1967 publication of the novel Self-Discovery, in which Savchenko warned about the ethical problems involved in the creation of clones, Savchenko occupied the leading position in Soviet science fiction.

In 1973, the twenty five-volume collection Library of Contemporary Fantastic Literature was published under the name Anthology, in which an abbreviated version of Savchenko's programmatic story "The Trial of Truth" appeared. The collection included the best publications of the largest and most popular science fiction authors of the United States, Great Britain, Japan, and France. In Savchenko's story, the protagonist, Dmitri Kaluzhnikov, makes a fundamental discovery that leads to the merging of Dmitri's individuality with an intelligent substance, with the ensuing catastrophic effect of the creation of a new Tunguska meteorite. The story became a cult text for an entire generation of young Soviet engineers.

In the late period of his work, Savchenko focused on the biological side of the phenomenon of the Übermensch, as can be seen in the story "Confused" (1983). Also widely known is the novel Over the Pass (1984), which explored the Communist future of Earth.

On Wednesday, January 19, 2005, he was found dead in his apartment in Kyiv. Since 2005, the International Assembly of Fantastic Literature Authors, which convenes every year in Kyiv under the name "Portal," has awarded a prize in Savchenko's name called "Self-Discovery" to works which shows a writer's qualitative growth.

Literary Awards
Prize at the Detgiz RSFSR contest for the novel Black Stars (1960, Moscow)
"Chumatskii Way" prize for the story "The Kidnappers' Essences" (1989, Kyiv)
"Great Circle" award for the novel Position in the Universe (1994)
"Philosopher's Stone Award" (2002, "Golden Bridge" Fourth Festival of the Fantastic in Charkov, Ukraine)
"Aelita" award for contribution to Russian-language fiction (2003)

List of Works

Novels
Black Stars (1956)
Second Expedition to the Strange Planet (1959)
Self-Discovery (1967)
Dead End (1972)
Meeters (1980)
The Success Algorithm (1983)
Over the Pass (1984)
The Kidnappers' Essence (1988)
Position in the Universe (1992)
A Time of Great Negations (2002)

Expository Technical Writing
Semiconductors at Launch (1958) 
Technology and Properties of Microelectronic Diode Rays (1965) 
"Sixteen new formulas of physics and cosmology. Universal correlation Field Activity (U-field), manifesting itself as universal communication variables and phenomena" (1992)

Available Publications in English
 Self-Discovery. New York, McMillan, 1979. 
 Success Algorithm in New Soviet Science Fiction. New York, Collier Books, 1980.
 Mixed Up in Red Star Tales: A Century of Russian and Soviet Science Fiction. Montpelier, VT, RIS Publications, 2015.

References

External links
 

1933 births
2005 deaths
Electronics engineers
Writers from Kyiv
Ukrainian science fiction writers
Soviet science fiction writers
Soviet male writers
20th-century male writers
Engineers from Kyiv